Schirrmann may refer to

Richard Schirrmann (youth hostel pioneer)

or

Hayyim (Jefim) Schirmann (Jewish scholar)